Philippe-Armand Martin (born 28 April 1949 in Cumières) is a French politician, a member of the National Assembly.  He represents the Marne department, and is a member of the Union for a Popular Movement

References

1949 births
Living people
People from Marne (department)
Rally for the Republic politicians
Union for a Popular Movement politicians
Gaullism, a way forward for France
MEPs for France 1994–1999
Deputies of the 13th National Assembly of the French Fifth Republic
Deputies of the 14th National Assembly of the French Fifth Republic